Catherine J. Melchert is the former mayor of Bartlett, Illinois from 1993 to 2009. In 1982 she was appointed trustee, and later elected to a two-year term in 1983. She served as a trustee until 1993, when she was elected mayor. She has been a Bartlett resident since 1970.

In 2008, the U.S. Conference of Mayors gave Melchert a "small town honorable mention climate award" for her work in adopting a new building code that promoted environmental protection and conservation.

See also

Bartlett, Illinois

References

People from Bartlett, Illinois
Politicians from Chicago
Mayors of places in Illinois
Women mayors of places in Illinois
Living people
Year of birth missing (living people)
21st-century American women